UFU may refer to either:
 Universal Flow University
The United Firefighters Union of Australia
Ukrainian Free University in Munich, Germany
Ural Federal University in Russia
Universidade Federal de Uberlândia
Ulster Farmers Union